Dermaleipa is a genus of moths in the family Erebidae.

Selected species
Dermaleipa metaxantha Hampson, 1913
Dermaleipa minians Mabille, 1884

References
Natural History Museum Lepidoptera genus database

Ophiusini
Moth genera